Branislav Mezei (born October 8, 1980) is a Slovak professional ice hockey player. Mezei is a defenceman currently with HK Nitra of the Slovak Extraliga. Mezei has previous played in the National Hockey League (NHL) with the New York Islanders and Florida Panthers. Mezei also played for Barys Astana and HC Plzen of the KHL, and Espoo Blues of the SM-liiga. Mezei was a first-round pick of the Islanders in the 1999 NHL Entry Draft, tenth overall.

Playing career
Mezei moved to Canada to play junior hockey with the Belleville Bulls of the Ontario Hockey League. Mezei played three seasons with the Bulls from 1997 until 2000. After his second season, he was drafted tenth-overall by the New York Islanders. He joined the Islanders organization in 2000. Mezei played two seasons in the Islanders organization, including 66 games with the Islanders. He recorded his first NHL assist against the Columbus Blue Jackets on December 23, 2000, and he scored his first NHL goal on March 31, 2001, against the Boston Bruins. In July 2002, he was traded to the Florida Panthers. He was a member of the Panthers from 2002 until 2008, playing a further 178 games primarily in a defensive role. He tallied 5 goals and 19 assists in his NHL career.

During the 2004–05 lockout, Mezei played for Trinec Ocelari HC and HK Dukla Trenčín. In 2008, Mezei moved to Europe to play with Barys Astana of the KHL. He has since played for Espoo Blues, HC Plzen, HC Pardubice and Lev Poprad.

On August 31, 2014, Mezei remained in the KHL, signing with his fourth club, in Croatian based KHL Medveščak Zagreb on a one-year deal. After just 8 games with the Croatian club, Mezei was released mutually from his contract in order to return to his native Slovakia with HK Nitra on October 24, 2014.

International play
He has also played with the Slovak national ice hockey team in Ice Hockey World Championships in 2001, 2004 and 2008.

Career statistics

Regular season and playoffs

International

References

External links

1980 births
Living people
Avtomobilist Yekaterinburg players
Barys Nur-Sultan players
Belleville Bulls players
Bridgeport Sound Tigers players
Espoo Blues players
Florida Panthers players
HC Lev Poprad players
Lowell Lock Monsters players
KHL Medveščak Zagreb players
National Hockey League first-round draft picks
New York Islanders draft picks
New York Islanders players
HK Nitra players
HC Oceláři Třinec players
HC Dynamo Pardubice players
HC Plzeň players
Sportspeople from Nitra
San Antonio Rampage players
Slovak ice hockey defencemen
HC Vityaz players
Slovak expatriate ice hockey players in the United States
Slovak expatriate ice hockey players in Canada
Slovak expatriate ice hockey players in the Czech Republic
Slovak expatriate sportspeople in Kazakhstan
Slovak expatriate ice hockey players in Russia
Slovak expatriate sportspeople in Croatia
Slovak expatriate ice hockey players in Finland
Expatriate ice hockey players in Croatia
Expatriate ice hockey players in Kazakhstan